The 1967–68 Honduran Liga Nacional season was the 3rd edition of the Honduran Liga Nacional.  The format of the tournament remained the same as the previous season.  Club Deportivo Olimpia won the title and qualified to the 1968 CONCACAF Champions' Cup.

1967–68 teams

 C.D. Atlético Español (Tegucigalpa)
 Atlético Indio (Tegucigalpa, promoted)
 C.D. España (San Pedro Sula)
 C.D. Honduras (El Progreso)
 C.D. Marathón (San Pedro Sula)
 C.D. Motagua (Tegucigalpa)
 C.D. Olimpia (Tegucigalpa)
 C.D. Platense (Puerto Cortés)
 C.D. San Pedro (San Pedro Sula)
 C.D.S. Vida (La Ceiba)

Regular season

Standings

Top scorer
  Junia Garden (Vida) with 13 goals

Squads

References

Liga Nacional de Fútbol Profesional de Honduras seasons
1967–68 in Honduran football
Honduras